Rory Darnell Sparrow (born June 12, 1958) is an American former professional basketball player who played in the National Basketball Association (NBA).

Born in Suffolk, Virginia, Sparrow played at Eastside High School in Paterson, New Jersey, and was an inaugural inductee into the school's Hall of Fame.

He played collegiately at Villanova University, where he scored 1183 career points, and made 495 assists.  In college, Sparrow made game-winning shots in the last ten seconds of the game on five occasions.

Sparrow, a 6'2" guard, was selected 75th overall (round 4, pick 6) of the 1980 NBA Draft by the New Jersey Nets. Including the Nets, he played with the Atlanta Hawks, New York Knicks, Chicago Bulls, Miami Heat, Sacramento Kings and Los Angeles Lakers over a 12-year career, retiring after the 1991-92 season. He scored the first field goal in Miami Heat history, when the franchise was created in 1988.

Biography

Throughout his 12-year career Rory Sparrow was known as one of the steadiest guards in the NBA. He had his best years with the Atlanta Hawks and the New York Knicks in the early 1980s, then went on to become a charter member of the expansion Miami Heat. In addition to his on-court success, Sparrow earned equal recognition for his tireless efforts in the community. In 1987 he was one of eight charitable athletes honored by Sports Illustrated as co-Sportsman of the Year.

Sparrow's NBA career had humble beginnings. After playing for Rollie Massimino at Villanova, he was selected by the New Jersey Nets in the fourth round of the 1980 NBA Draft. When the Nets waived Sparrow in training camp, he turned to the Continental Basketball Association, where he latched on with the Scranton Aces. In 20 games for the Aces, Sparrow averaged 24.1 points and 9.0 assists. The Nets called him up twice during the 1980–81 campaign, but he appeared in only 15 NBA games that year.

Prior to the 1981–82 season New Jersey traded Sparrow to the Atlanta Hawks for a fourth-round draft choice. Coach Kevin Loughery made him an immediate starter at point guard, and Sparrow never looked back. Leaving his CBA days behind him, he appeared in all 82 games and averaged 10.5 points and 5.2 assists in more than 30 minutes per game. The Hawks finished 42-40 but lost in the first round of the playoffs.

Midway through the next season Atlanta traded Sparrow to the New York Knicks for Scott Hastings. Over the next five years Sparrow became a staple in an otherwise shifting New York backcourt. He enjoyed his greatest team success during the 1983–84 campaign. The Knicks posted a 47–35 record, beat the Detroit Pistons in the opening round of the playoffs, and then fell to the Boston Celtics in a tough seven-game series in the conference semifinals. As a starter in the backcourt, Sparrow averaged 10.4 points and 6.8 assists in the regular season, then contributed 11.2 points per game in the playoffs.

The following year, he set a career high for assists with 7.1 per game. In 1985–86, he averaged 10.8 points and 6.4 assists. New York, however, won only 23 games, posting its worst record since 1963–64.

During his tenure in New York, Sparrow set up the Rory F. Sparrow Foundation, a charitable organization designed to aid underprivileged children in the New York metropolitan area. At the end of the 1985–86 season Sparrow was recognized for his efforts when he and the Lakers' Michael Cooper were named co-winners of the J. Walter Kennedy Citizenship Award. Then, in the 1987 year-end issue of Sports Illustrated, Sparrow was featured on the cover as one of eight "Athletes Who Care." The magazine collectively honored the group as Sportsmen and Sportswomen of the Year.

Early in the 1987–88 season the Knicks traded Sparrow to the Chicago Bulls, where he played sparingly as a backup to Michael Jordan and Sam Vincent. Prior to the 1988–89 campaign he signed as a free agent with the Miami Heat. On November 5, 1988, in a game against the Los Angeles Clippers, Sparrow scored the first points in Heat history. He went on to average a career-high 12.5 points for the year, second on the team behind Kevin Edwards.

In his second season with the Heat, Sparrow was relegated to a back-up role behind rookie Sherman Douglas. Prior to the 1990–91 season he was traded to the Sacramento Kings, where he found new life and scored 10.4 points per game. Sparrow split the 1991–92 season between the Chicago Bulls and the Los Angeles Lakers before retiring at age 34. All told, he tallied 7,557 points for seven different teams and posted a career average of 9.0 points per game.

In 1994, he went to work for the NBA league office as player programs manager.

References

External links
Career NBA stats @ basketball-reference.com
Career NBA stats @ basketballreference.com
Rory Sparrow and the NBA Legends Easing Rookie Transition by Talia Bargil, October 19, 2005 @ nbrpa.com

1958 births
Living people
African-American basketball players
American men's basketball players
Atlanta Hawks players
Basketball players from Paterson, New Jersey
Basketball players from Virginia
Chicago Bulls players
Eastside High School (Paterson, New Jersey) alumni
Los Angeles Lakers players
Miami Heat players
New Jersey Nets draft picks
New Jersey Nets players
New York Knicks players
Sportspeople from Suffolk, Virginia
Point guards
Sacramento Kings players
Villanova Wildcats men's basketball players
21st-century African-American people
20th-century African-American sportspeople